is a 1990 Japanese magical girl anime television series created by Ashi Productions and Big West Advertising. It aired on TV Setouchi from April 2, 1990 to February 4, 1991 spanning 43 episodes. The timeslot was previously occupied by Idol Densetsu Eriko and succeeded by Getter Robo Go.

Cast and characters

 /

Titles in other languages
 ("Idol Angel Yoko") (China),  (Taiwan),  (Hong Kong, Macau and Guangdong)

 ("The Adventures of Yoko and Saki") (Spain only)

External links
Official Ashi webpage 

1990 anime television series debuts
1991 Japanese television series endings
Ashi Productions
Comedy anime and manga
Anime with original screenplays
Magical girl anime and manga
Music in anime and manga